Zdeňka Žádníková-Volencová (born 25 October 1974) is a Czech actress and musician, known particularly for her stage acting at . She was named Discovery of the Year at the 2005 TýTý Awards, for her role as Ivana in the Prima televize television series Rodinná pouta. Žádníková-Volencová can play the western concert flute, recorder, saxophone and piano. She has four children.

Selected filmography
Anne Frank: The Whole Story (television miniseries, 2001)
Rodinná pouta (television, 2004–2006)
Velmi křehké vztahy (television, 2007–2009)
Little Knights Tale (2009)

References

External links

1974 births
Living people
People from Ústí nad Orlicí
Czech television actresses
Czech film actresses
Czech stage actresses
20th-century Czech actresses
21st-century Czech actresses
Academy of Performing Arts in Prague alumni